Alexander D. Wissner-Gross is an American research scientist and entrepreneur. He is a fellow at the Institute for Applied Computational Science at Harvard University.

Education
At the Massachusetts Institute of Technology, where he researched nanotechnology, Wissner-Gross triple-majored in physics, electrical engineering and mathematics. He was awarded the Marshall Scholarship, and was the last student to triple-major at MIT before the option was discontinued. Wissner-Gross also has a Ph.D in physics from Harvard University.

Entrepreneurship
In 2007, Wissner-Gross founded the technology company CO2Stats, which measures the amount of carbon dioxide emitted by using a website. CO2Stats is based in Cambridge, Massachusetts, and received funding from the seed venture capital firm Y Combinator.

Activities
Wissner-Gross co-authored a paper with mathematician Cameron Freer describing a "biophysical model for explaining sophisticated intelligent behavior in human and nonhuman animals", published in the journal Physical Review Letters, which he expected would be useful for artificial intelligence. Researcher Gary Marcus wrote an article in The New Yorker criticizing the paper, saying they were "essentially promising a television set that walks your dog".

References

External links
 Personal website
 
 Alexander Wissner-Gross on hmolpedia

Living people
21st-century American physicists
Year of birth missing (living people)
Massachusetts Institute of Technology School of Science alumni
Harvard Graduate School of Arts and Sciences alumni
MIT Department of Physics alumni
MIT School of Engineering alumni